Stordal is a former municipality in Møre og Romsdal county, Norway. It merged with Norddal municipality to establish the new Fjord municipality in 2020. It was part of the Sunnmøre region. The administrative centre of the municipality was the village of Stordal. The historic farm and museum of Ytste Skotet lies along the Storfjorden in the western part of the municipality. Most of the municipality lies on the eastern side of the fjord.

Stordal had relatively good agricultural land, and the main source of income is livestock. Stordal has also been home to furniture production and continues with the industry today.

At the time if its dissolution in 2020, the  municipality is the 306th largest by area out of the 422 municipalities in Norway. Stordal is the 396th most populous municipality in Norway with a population of 972.

General information

Stordal was established as a municipality on 1 January 1892 when it was separated from the large municipality of Stranda (to the southwest). The initial population of the municipality was 850. During the 1960s, there were many municipal mergers across Norway due to the work of the Schei Committee. On 1 January 1965, the three neighboring municipalities of Ørskog, Skodje, and Stordal were merged into one large Ørskog municipality. Prior to the merger, there were 1,052 inhabitants in Stordal. The merger, however, was short-lived, and on 1 January 1977 it was reversed and the three municipalities were once again separated.

On 1 January 2020, the municipalities of Stordal and Norddal were merged into the new Fjord Municipality.

Name
The Old Norse form of the name was Stóladalr. The first element is the plural genitive case of stóll which means "chair" and the last element is dalr which means "valley" or "dale". Two mountains around the valley have the name Stolen ("the chair"). Before 1918, the name was written Stordalen.

Coat of arms
The coat of arms was granted on 30 August 1991. The arms show a gold pale on a blue background. The pale symbolises the forestry and furniture manufacturing in the municipality, which traditionally uses a dovetail system to join two pieces of wood. The same symbol also indicates the strong community feeling in the villages.

Churches
The Church of Norway had one parish with one church, within the municipality of Stordal. There is also the old church, Rosekyrkja, which is now a museum. It is part of the Austre Sunnmøre prosti (deanery) in the Diocese of Møre.

Geography
Stordal municipality is located along the inner Storfjorden in Sunnmøre. The majority of the municipality lies east of the fjord, while a small uninhabited mountainous area on the west side of the fjord is also part of Stordal. Ytste Skotet is a preserved historic farm/museum that is located on the steep mountainsides on the west side of the fjord. Most of the municipality surrounds the Stordalen valley on the east side of the fjord.

The municipalities of Ørskog and Vestnes lie to the north of Stordal, Rauma lies to the east, Norddal and Stranda lie to the south, and Sykkylven lies to the west. The municipality is fairly isolated, with only two road connections to the outside world. Norwegian County Road 650 runs through the municipality from north to south, connecting it to Ørskog Municipality to the north and to Stranda Municipality to the south. Due to the mountainous landscape, the highway goes through the Dyrkorn Tunnel and Stordal Tunnel in the northern part of the municipality. The two tunnels are separated by the small village of Dyrkorn.

Government
All municipalities in Norway, including Stordal, are responsible for primary education (through 10th grade), outpatient health services, senior citizen services, unemployment and other social services, zoning, economic development, and municipal roads. The municipality is governed by a municipal council of elected representatives, which in turn elect a mayor.  The municipality falls under the Sunnmøre District Court and the Frostating Court of Appeal.

Municipal council
The municipal council of Stordal is made up of 15 representatives that are elected to four year terms. The party breakdown for the final municipal council was as follows:

Settlers in Iceland
Some people from Stordal settled in Iceland and used Stordal as their last name. The Stordal family is quite known in Iceland but the siblings Sigurður Kristinn Stórdal and Lovísa Stórdal are the most known well-known Stordals currently alive. They are descendants of Egill "Sterki" Stórdal and Ásgerður "Fagra" Stórdal. Egill and his wife became farmers in Stordal which is now known as Skorradalur in Borgarfjörður, Iceland.

See also
List of former municipalities of Norway

References

External links

Municipal fact sheet from Statistics Norway 

 
Fjord (municipality)
Former municipalities of Norway
1892 establishments in Norway
1965 disestablishments in Norway
1977 establishments in Norway
2020 disestablishments in Norway
Populated places established in 1892
Populated places disestablished in 2020